Federico Matías Javier Zaracho (born 10 March 1998) is an Argentine footballer who plays as an attacking midfielder for Atlético Mineiro.

Club career 
Zaracho came up through the youth ranks of Racing Club. He made his league debut on 17 December 2016 against Union de Santa Fe.

On 16 October 2020, Zaracho joined Brazilian club Atlético Mineiro.

International
Zaracho made his debut for the Argentina national football team on 26 March 2019 in a friendly against Morocco, as a 76th-minute substitute for Leandro Paredes.

Career statistics

Club

Honours
Racing Club
 Argentine Primera División: 2018–19
 Trofeo de Campeones de la Superliga Argentina: 2019

Atlético Mineiro
Campeonato Brasileiro Série A: 2021
Copa do Brasil: 2021
Campeonato Mineiro: 2021, 2022
Supercopa do Brasil: 2022

Argentina U23
 Pre-Olympic Tournament: 2020

Individual
 Primera División Best Newcomer: 2018–19
 Bola de Prata Best Newcomer: 2021

References

External links

1998 births
Living people
Sportspeople from Buenos Aires Province
Argentine footballers
Association football midfielders
Argentina under-20 international footballers
Argentina international footballers
Racing Club de Avellaneda footballers
Clube Atlético Mineiro players
Argentine Primera División players
Campeonato Brasileiro Série A players
Argentine expatriate footballers
Argentine expatriate sportspeople in Brazil
Expatriate footballers in Brazil
Argentine people of indigenous peoples descent